The  Murray Bridge Training Area (also called Murray Bridge Army Training Area) is an Australian Army training area located in South Australia in the locality of Burdett about  east of the city of Murray Bridge and about  east of the centre of the city of Adelaide. The training area was established prior to 1970. This wetland has been listed as a wetland of national importance since at least 1995.

See also

 Adelaide Universities Regiment
 Australian Army Cadets

References

Murray Mallee
Australian Army
Military installations in South Australia
Wetlands of South Australia
Constructed wetlands in Australia